Tony DePaul is the current writer of the Lee Falk created adventure comic strip The Phantom. DePaul has been writing the newspaper strip since Falk died in 1999. As of mid-2018, the artists illustrating his stories are Mike Manley and Jeff Weigel.

Tony has also written Phantom stories for Scandinavian publisher Egmont since 1993, in their "Fantomen" (Phantom) comic books.

He previously worked as a journalist for over twenty years, but is today a freelance writer.

External links
 Article on Phantomwiki.
 Interview with De Paul
 Tony DePaul's comics in Finnish Mustanaamio.

American comics writers
Living people
Year of birth missing (living people)